For the 1950 Vuelta a España, the field consisted of 42 riders; 26 finished the race.

References

1950 Vuelta a España
1950